Castell y Gwynt is a top of Glyder Fach in Snowdonia, north-west Wales. It has the merit of being the only 3000 ft Welsh summit classed as only a Nuttall, hence it is not included in the Welsh 3000s. It has a prominence of 15.7 m (51.5 ft), and was only included on the Nuttall's list after re-surveying in 2007. The top is more famous as a feature than a summit.

"Castell y Gwynt" and the "Cantilever Stone" featured in Walt Disney's Dragonslayer.

References

External links

www.geograph.co.uk : photos of Glyder Fach

Capel Curig
Mountains and hills of Snowdonia
Nuttalls
Mountains and hills of Conwy County Borough